is a Japanese horror manga series written and illustrated by Masaaki Nakayama. It was adapted into a live-action film released in July 2013.

Cast
Anna Ishibashi
Kenta Suga
Kōdai Asaka
Kanji Tsuda
Shimako Iwai

References

External links
Official film website 

Horror anime and manga
Akita Shoten manga
Shōnen manga
Manga adapted into films
Japanese horror films